Andreas von Bülow (born 17 July 1937) is a German politician of the Social Democratic Party (SPD) and writer. He was Minister for Research and Technology from 1980 to 1982. Von Bülow has authored books about intelligence agencies, including In the Name of the State. CIA, BND and the criminal machinations of secret services. and The CIA and 11 September (Die CIA und der 11. September). He holds a doctorate degree in Jurisprudence.

Political career
Bülow, a member of the Bülow family, served as secretary of state in the German Federal Ministry of Defence (1976–1980) and Minister for Research and Technology (1980–1982), both during the Chancellor Helmut Schmidt administration, and was regarded as a "rising star" of German politics at the time.  He served for 25 years as an SPD member of the German parliament (1969–1994). In the late eighties and early nineties, he served on the parliamentary committee on intelligence services ("Parlamentarischer Kontrollausschuss"). This committee supervises German intelligence agencies and has access to classified information. In the early nineties, Bülow also served as SPD ranking member of the Schalck-Golodkowski investigation committee, a task that first led him to inquire into white collar crime in connection with Eastern intelligence services, and later also into what he labels "criminal activities" of Western intelligence services. His first major publication dealing with this realm, In the Name of the State is a heavily referenced and extensive study focusing mostly on the CIA. Since leaving the Bundestag, he has largely left the SPD's political loop.

9/11
Bülow wrote a book called The CIA and 11 September, in which he implies US government complicity in the September 11, 2001 attacks. 
Planning the attacks was a master deed, in technical and organizational terms. To hijack four big airliners within a few minutes and fly them into targets within a single hour and doing so on complicated flight routes! That is unthinkable, without backing from the secret apparatuses of state and industry. Tagesspiegel, 13. Jan. 2002 

At his home in Bonn, he told an interviewer for The Daily Telegraph : "If what I say is right, the whole US government should end up behind bars" and '"They have hidden behind a veil of secrecy and destroyed the evidence – that they invented the story of 19 Muslims working within Osama bin Laden's al-Qa'eda – in order to hide the truth of their own covert operation." .

Affiliations
He is a member of:
Scholars for 9/11 Truth and Justice.
Axis for Peace Conference.

References

1937 births
Living people
Federal government ministers of Germany
Andreas
Social Democratic Party of Germany politicians
Members of the Bundestag for Baden-Württemberg
Members of the Bundestag 1990–1994
Members of the Bundestag 1987–1990
Politicians from Dresden
Heidelberg University alumni
German conspiracy theorists
9/11 conspiracy theorists